The women's rhythmic group all-around competition at the 2016 Summer Olympics was held at the Rio Olympic Arena.

The medals were presented by Alex Gilady, IOC member, Israel, and the flowers presented by Slava Corn, Vice President of the FIG, Canada.

Competition format
The competition consisted of a qualification round and a final round. The top eight teams in the qualification round advance to the final round. In each round, the teams perform two routines (one with ribbons, one with clubs and hoops), with the scores added to give a total.

Qualification

Final

References

rhythmic group all-around
2016
2016 in women's gymnastics
Women's events at the 2016 Summer Olympics